Trotkova is a settlement in the Municipality of Benedikt in northeastern Slovenia. It lies in the Slovene Hills. The area is part of the traditional region of Styria. It is now included in the Drava Statistical Region.

An extensive Roman-period burial ground with sixty burial mounds has been identified near the settlement.

References

External links
Trotkova at Geopedia

Populated places in the Municipality of Benedikt